José Luis Soto Quirós (13 September 1932 – 11 February 2006) was a Costa Rican football player, who played as a striker.

Club career
Born in Alajuela, Soto played club football in Costa Rica, Mexico, El Salvador, Guatemala, Venezuela and Ecuador. He made his debut with Moravia in 1950.

Soto signed with Mexican Primera División side Deportivo Irapuato in 1954.

In 1958 he became Costa Rica Primera Division top goalscorer and was honoured athlete of the year. He won two league titles with Saprissa (1952 & 1953) and one with Alajuelense (1958).

International career
Nicknamed Saningo, Soto represented his country in 4 FIFA World Cup qualification matches.

Managerial career
After he retired from playing, Soto became a football coach. He managed Cartaginés, Puriscal, Pérez Zeledón, Sagrada Familia, Golfito, Santos de Guápiles and Orión.

He died, aged 73, in February 2006. He was survived by his wife and four children.

References

External links
 Carrera deportiva de Saningo Soto

1932 births
2006 deaths
People from Alajuela
Costa Rican footballers
Costa Rica international footballers
Deportivo Saprissa players
Irapuato F.C. footballers
L.D. Alajuelense footballers
C.D. FAS footballers
C.D. Atlético Marte footballers
C.D. Suchitepéquez players
C.S. Emelec footballers
C.S. Cartaginés players
Liga FPD players
Liga MX players
Costa Rican expatriate footballers
Expatriate footballers in Ecuador
Expatriate footballers in El Salvador
Expatriate footballers in Venezuela
Expatriate footballers in Mexico
Costa Rican football managers
Association football forwards